The 1969 U.S. Open was the 69th U.S. Open, held June 12–15 at the Cypress Creek Course of Champions Golf Club in Houston, Texas. Orville Moody won his only PGA Tour title, one stroke ahead of runners-up Deane Beman, Bob Rosburg, and 

A 14-year veteran of the U.S. Army, Moody entered the final round in second place, three shots behind  At age 35, Moody advanced through both local and sectional qualifying in 1969, and as of 2021 is the last champion to do so. It was his only win on the PGA Tour, with only one additional top-10 finish in a major, two months later at the PGA Championship.
 
Battling an ailing knee, defending champion Lee Trevino (of Texas) missed the cut by a stroke; he won the title again in 1971.

The Cypress Creek Course hosted the Houston Champions International event on the PGA Tour, today's Houston Open, from 1966 through 1971, and the Ryder Cup in 1967. It later hosted The Tour Championship five times (1990, 1997, 1999, 2001, and 2003) and the U.S. Amateur in 1993.

Course layout

Past champions in the field

Made the cut

Missed the cut

Round summaries

First round
Thursday, June 12, 1969

Second round
Friday, June 13, 1969

Third round
Saturday, June 14, 1969

Final round
Sunday, June 15, 1969

Miller Barber began the final round with a three-stroke lead, but it vanished after he bogeyed five of the first eight holes. He struggled to a 78 (+8) and dropped into a tie for sixth place, which allowed Moody to take the lead. At one point on the back nine, eight competitors were separated by just two  Bob Rosburg saved par from the sand at 17 to stay tied with Moody, but after a drive into the rough on 18, he again found a greenside bunker. Playing in the final pairing with Barber, Moody had four consecutive pars to finish and preserved the one-stroke advantage for the championship. Barber needed only a 75 (+5) on Sunday to force a playoff, but finished three

Final leaderboard

Scorecard
Final round

Cumulative tournament scores, relative to par
{|class="wikitable" span = 50 style="font-size:85%;
|-
|style="background: Pink;" width=10|
|Birdie
|style="background: PaleGreen;" width=10|
|Bogey
|style="background: Green;" width=10|
|Double bogey
|}

References

External links
U.S. Open – History

Champions Golf Club

U.S. Open (golf)
Golf in Houston
Sports competitions in Houston
U.S. Open
U.S. Open (golf)
U.S. Open (golf)
U.S. Open (golf)
1960s in Houston